Seward is an unincorporated community in Winnebago County, Illinois, United States, and is located west of Rockford. It is part of the Rockford, Illinois Metropolitan Statistical Area.

References

Unincorporated communities in Winnebago County, Illinois
Unincorporated communities in Illinois
Rockford metropolitan area, Illinois
Populated places established in 1818